European Parliament elections were held in Denmark on 13 June 2004 to elect the 14 Danish members of the European Parliament. The opposition Social Democrats made major gains, mainly at the expense of Eurosceptic parties such as the June Movement.

Results
Seats were allocated first by the D'Hondt method to electoral coalitions (Social Democrats + Socialist People's Party; Venstre + Conservative People's Party; June Movement + People's Movement against the EU; Danish Social Liberal Party + Christian Democrats), then subsequently between the parties in each coalition. Compared to straight allocation by party, the People's Movement against the EU gained one seat at the expense of the Conservative People's Party.

References

Denmark
European Parliament elections in Denmark
Europe